Hu Xia (English name: Fox Hu; born 1 March 1990) is a Chinese singer, actor. He won the sixth season of Taiwan's One Million Star in 2010 and released his debut album Hu Love Xia later the year. Apart from his albums, he has sung a great number of soundtracks for Chinese TV series, movies and games, the most famous ones are Those Years (那些年) for You Are the Apple of My Eye in 2011 and Don't You Know (知否知否) for The Story of Minglan in 2018. Other notables include Rush to the Dead Summer, Story of Yanxi Palace, Le Coup de Foudre, Word of Honor and Heaven Official’s Blessing.

Career

2008 – 2009: Pre-debut and contests 
Hu Xia has participated in several Guangxi local contests before he entered the BEST 8 of Mengniu Dairy “Running towards Beijing, Achieving music dreams” contest held by Enlight Pictures in 2008. He then banded with other competitors and became a member of Fengyunbang, who has also performed at S.H.E and Fahrenheit’s concerts in mainland China as warming guest.

Following the disband of Fengyunbang in September 2009, Hu Xia went to Taiwan to compete in the sixth season of One Million Star. Hu Xia was outstanding since the beginning and in the round 13 and 14, he attempted a Taiwanese song “Jiahou” (家后, Ke-au) which gained full marks. Hu Xia finally won the contest in May 2010 and signed with Sony Music Entertainment Taiwan.

2010 – 2012: Debut, Those years, Flame of love 
On December 17, 2010, Hu Xia released his debut album Hu Love Xia. The title was taken from his father and his mother’s family names, Hu and Xia, and this was also how he got his real name. In 2011, he sang the theme song, “Those Years” (那些年), for the Taiwanese movie You Are the Apple of My Eye. The song became a mega hit in Asia and the MV has more than 100 million views in YouTube. In the Taiwanese KKBOX singles daily charts, "Those Years" remained at the top for 64 consecutive days, from 22 August to 22 October 2011, breaking the previous record of 45 consecutive days. The song was nominated for the Best Original Film Soundtrack award at the 48th Golden Horse Awards.

On February 24, 2012, he released his second album Flame of love. On September 14, 2012, the Move Sad Fairy Tale starring Liu Shishi and Hu Xia was on cinema in mainland China, and Hu Xia sang the theme song “Sad Fairy Tale” (伤心童话).

2013 – 2017: Silly Tango, Love Odyssey 
On June 20, 2013, Hu Xia released his third album Silly Tango. In November, he sang the theme song “Letting Go” (放下) for the movie The Four 2. In April 2014, he covered Lao Lang’s “My Old Classmate“ (同桌的你), which was the theme song for the same-name movie. In August 2014, he released “Ruthless” (无情), the theme song for The Four Final Battle.

Hu Xia released his fourth album Love Odyssey on April 14, 2015. In April 2015, he starred in the movie The Left Ear and released the promotional song “A beautiful yesterday” (美好的昨天) for the movie. After the contracts ended, Hu Xia chose to left Sony Music Taiwan and Enlight Pictures in 2016. From June to July 2016, he participated in the Chinese and South Korean music show The Collaboration and teamed up with Zico. In June 2017, Hu Xia released “Rush to the Dead Summer”(夏至未至), the theme song for the same-name TV series adapted from Guo Jingming’s novel.

2018 – Now: Reading the old, Don’t you know 
In August 2018, Hu Xia sang the first ending song, “Sighs of the Palace Walls”(红墙叹), for Story of Yanxi Palace. In December 2018, feating Yisa Yu, he released the theme song for TV series The Story of Minglan: “Don’t You Know?” (知否知否), which became a mega-hit. On April 12, 2019, Hu Xia participated in the final of the music competition show Singer (Season 7) as the music partner of Chyi Yu. On April 17, 2019, Hu Xia released his new album Reading the Old, under his own label Raining Culture.

In March 2020, Hu Xia competed in the music competition show Singer: Year of the Hits (Season 8) as a challenge singer. In July 2020, Hu Xia released “Indeterminate Fate”(未定的注定), the promotional song for the game Tears of Themis. In December 2020, he sang the ending theme for donghua Heaven Official’s Blessing: “Red Supreme”(红绝). Hu Xia participated in the competition show Shine! Super Brothers from December 2020 to February 2021. In March 2021, he released “Untitled”(无题), which is one of the soundtrack for the TV series Word of Honors.  From September to December 2021, Hu Xia competed in Singing with Legends season 3, in which he paired up with George Lam and won the best pair prize of the season.

Discography

Albums
 胡 爱夏 (Hu Love Xia) (2010/12/17)
 燃点 (Flame of Love) (2012/02/24)
 傻瓜探戈 (Silly Tango) (2013/06/22)
 替我照顧她 (Love Odyssey) (2015/04/14)
念·旧 (Reading the Old) (2019/04/17)

EP 

 三 (Three) (2013/05/17)
 拾 (Ten) (2020/05/14)

Singles

OST

Filmography

Variety Show

Film

References 

1990 births
Living people
Chinese Mandopop singers
21st-century Chinese male singers
Singers from Guangxi
Chinese male film actors
Male actors from Guangxi
One Million Star contestants
People from Nanning